Vehicle registration plates of the United Arab Emirates come under the jurisdiction of each of the country's seven emirates and each of them have their unique plate numbering design and system. The international code for the United Arab Emirates is UAE.

Design
Each emirate has its own vehicle registration plate design.

References

Road transport in the United Arab Emirates
UAE
 Registration plates